1981 Women's Nordic Football Championship was the eighth edition of the Women's Nordic Football Championship tournament. It was held from 15 July to 19 July in Finland.

Standings

Results

Goalscorers 
2 goals
  Pia Sundhage
  Birgitta Söderström
1 goal
  Eva Andersson
  Marit Bjørkli
  Eeva Jääskeläinen
  Jutta Rautiainen
  Heidi Støre
  Karin Ödlund
Own goal
  Mariann Mortensen Kvistnes (against Finland)
  Unknown player (against Denmark)

Sources 
Nordic Championships (Women) 1981 Rec.Sport.Soccer Statistics Foundation
Lautela, Yrjö & Wallén, Göran: Rakas jalkapallo — Sata vuotta suomalaista jalkapalloa, p. 419. Football Association of Finland / Teos Publishing 2007. .

Women's Nordic Football Championship
1981–82 in European football
1981 in women's association football
1981–82
1981 in Norwegian football
1981 in Finnish football
1981 in Swedish football
1981 in Danish football
July 1981 sports events in Europe
1981 in Finnish women's sport